Richard Browne (born July 9, 1991 in Jackson, Mississippi) is an American sprint runner. In 2007 an accident sent him through a plate glass window, which resulted in an arterial bleed causing permanent damage to his right leg. In 2010, after 14 surgical operations, his leg was amputated. "I was 16 years old in the prime of my life. I go through a window one day and from that point on my life is changed forever".

At the 2012 Paralympic Games, he won a Silver Medal in the 100m event.
In July 2013 at the 2013 IPC Athletics World Championships at the Stade du Rhône in Lyon he broke Jonnie Peacock's world record when he recorded a time of 10.83 in the T44 100m semi-finals. He subsequently broke the T44 100m world record with a time of 10.75 in the 2013 Paralympic Anniversary Games in London. On April 18, 2014 Browne broke the T44 200m World Record, 21.91 (+1.4) at the Mt. Sac Relays in Los Angeles, CA. He also holds the world record over the T44 60m with an official time of 6.99. Browne ran the Emory Crossplex Invitational in Birmingham, AL on January 28, 2013. In 2013 Browne became the first T44 sprinter in history to compete in a world class able-body field when he ran at the 2013 Millrose Games in New York, NY. An equipment failure forced him to pull out of the race 10m before the finish line. In 2014 he again lined up in an international able-body 60m field at the Meeting De Mondeville in France.

See also
The Mechanics of Running Blades

References

Living people
Paralympic track and field athletes of the United States
Athletes (track and field) at the 2012 Summer Paralympics
Paralympic silver medalists for the United States
American male sprinters
American male high jumpers
1991 births
Sprinters with limb difference
World record holders in Paralympic athletics
Medalists at the 2012 Summer Paralympics
Paralympic medalists in athletics (track and field)
Paralympic sprinters